Chatrapati Sivaji is a 1974 Indian Tamil-language television film directed by S. A. Kannan and written by Thanjaivannan. Based on the life of the Maratha warrior Shivaji, it stars Sivaji Ganesan in the title role. The film premiered on Doordarshan on 21 July 1974.

Plot

Production 
July 1974 was when the tri-centenary of the Maratha warrior Shivaji's ascent to the throne was celebrated. To commemorate this, the Bombay branch of Doordarshan wanted to make a television film later titled Chatrapati Sivaji. T. S. Narayana Swamy, a Doordarshan producer, approached Sivaji Ganesan, who had previously portrayed Shivaji in the play Sivaji Kanda Hindu Rajyam and the film Bhakta Tukaram (1973). Ganesan accepted to play Shivaji, and even offered to finance the whole project. A. V. Meiyappan of AVM Productions lent his studio along with the necessary props for shooting. Thanjaivannan wrote the screenplay based on Ganesan's story. Ganesan's colleague S. A. Kannan was the director, and various technicians from Sivaji Films worked on the project.

Broadcast 
Chatrapati Sivaji premiered on Doordarshan on 21 July 1974, before airing on other television channels. Babasaheb Purandare gave an introductory in Marathi, after which the film was telecast in Tamil. In 1975, it became the first programme to be telecast on the Madras branch of Doordarshan. As of 2017, the film is preserved in their archives.

References

Bibliography 
 

1970s Tamil-language films
1974 films
Cultural depictions of Shivaji
Doordarshan television films